is a bullet hell shooter video game developed by Cave that was released on August 20, 2010 in arcades. A video game console port, was released on the Xbox 360 on May 26, 2011 in Japan. Rising Star Games released the game in North America and Europe on May 15, 2012.

It is the fourth horizontal shoot 'em up game from the company, the prior three being Progear, Deathsmiles, and Deathsmiles II. The game's soundtrack was composed by Ryu Umemoto. City Connection re-released the game as Akai Katana Shin for Nintendo Switch, PlayStation 4, PC and Xbox One on December 15, 2022.

Gameplay

Plot
Set in a parallel world resembling Japan's Taishō period, the people have discovered the powerful Blood Swords, the titular Akai Katana. Requiring human sacrifices to unleash their immense destructive power, these swords have been used by the empire to crush neighbouring countries. However, all the bloodshed and power gained through sacrificing close family members has made some of the swordsmen reconsider. With new fighter planes and the powered up swords at their disposal, this small band of rebels now fight back against the tyrannical empire.

Reception

Famitsu gave the game scores of 8, 8, 8 and 9 from four reviewers, adding up to a total score of 33 out of 40. As Rising Star's inaugural U.S. title, Tech-Gaming found the game a "promising offering, offering stateside shoot ‘em up fans an exceptional entry into an increasingly niche genre.", and praised the title's depth of play mechanics. GameSpot gave the game a score of 8 out of 10, describing it as "a well-crafted dose of over-the-top bullet-hell action." Destructoid gave the game a score of 9 out of 10, concluding that "you may just find yourself ascending to bullet hell heaven if you dedicate some time to learning the game’s obscure but absolutely thrilling mechanics."

Mean Machines described it as a "must-have blaster" for the Xbox 360, praising the gameplay, the "masterpiece" 2D graphics, and the "fantastic" hard rock soundtrack. Crunchyroll praised the challenging gameplay as well as Umemoto's "insane guitar" music as possibly "soundtrack of the year," concluding that "anyone interested in the genre should pick this one up and reward said risk with a small swirling bundle of gold."

Notes

References

External links

2010 video games
Alternate history video games
Arcade video games
Cave (company) games
Video games about ninja
Scrolling shooters
Shoot 'em ups
NESiCAxLive games
Video games developed in Japan
Video games featuring female protagonists
Video games scored by Ryu Umemoto
Xbox 360 games
Rising Star Games games